Walter Rheiner (18 March 1895 – 12 June 1925; born Walter Heinrich Schnorrenberg in Cologne, Germany) was a writer and poet associated with the German post-expressionists.

Early life 
Walter Rheiner was born in Cologne, Germany to his mother Ernestine Schnorrenberg and father. He married Amalie Friederike Schnorrenberg, who he affectionately called 'Fo'. They divorced in 1925. He published poems and prose works throughout his life. His work drew comparisons to contemporaries such as Georg Trakl and Franz Kafka. Rheiner was at his most productive, literarily, from 1916-1920. In his last five years, Rheiner's poetic output decreased. This may be due to factors such as poverty and drug addiction. He fought on the Eastern Front during World War I. One of Rheiner's most fertile artistic, relationships was with the German expressionist painter Conrad Felixmüller. Through connections due to this relationship, Rheiner's work was able to be published. Felixmüller illustrated Rheiner's novella. Following Rheiner's death, Felixmüller honoured his friend with a well-known portrait, 'Der Tod des Dichters Walter Rheiner'.

Drug Use 
Rheiner is often-remembered for his tragic association with substance abuse. This is exemplified in his major prose work Kokain (cocaine). Kokain was written in the summer of 1918 and serves as a typical example of, an autobiographical theme running through Rheiner's work. He became addicted to cocaine in 1915. He used morphine heavily. This led to his demise in 1925.

Publications 
Kokain, novella, 1918.
Das schmerzliche Meer, poems, 1918.
Der bunte Tag poems, 1919.

References

Sources 
 

1895 births
Writers from Cologne
1925 deaths
German poets